The 1962 Indiana Hoosiers football team represented the Indiana Hoosiers in the 1962 Big Ten Conference football season. They participated as members of the Big Ten Conference. The Hoosiers played their home games at Seventeenth Street Stadium in Bloomington, Indiana. The team was coached by Phil Dickens, in his fifth year as head coach of the Hoosiers.

Schedule

NFL Draft

References

External links
 Game program: Indiana vs. Washington State at Spokane – October 20, 1962

Indiana
Indiana Hoosiers football seasons
Indiana Hoosiers football